The 2nd constituency of Csongrád-Csanád County is one of the single member constituencies of the National Assembly, the national legislature of Hungary. The constituency standard abbreviation: Csongrád-Csanád 02. OEVK.

Since 2022, it has been represented by Béla Mihálffy of the Fidesz–KDNP party alliance.

Geography
The 2nd constituency is located in south-western part of Csongrád-Csanád County.

List of municipalities
The constituency includes the following municipalities:

Members
The constituency was first represented by László B. Nagy of the Fidesz from 2014 to 2022. He was succeeded by Béla Mihálffy of the KDNP in 2022.

References

Csongrád-Csanád 2nd